Reddest Red is the second studio album by Australian singer-songwriter Gyan, released in October 1992. The album peaked at number 105 on the ARIA charts.

Two singles were released from the album: "Something's Gotta Give" and "Visualize". The song "Will I With U" was later used in the film The Sum of Us and released on the soundtrack album to the film. New Zealand musician Dave Dobbyn played guitar on the album and contributed backing vocals.

Track listing
All songs by Gyan except where noted.
"Good News"
"Something's Gotta Give" (Gyan/Tim Gaze)
"Take From Me"
"Visualize"
"Mountain"
"Rooms By The Sea"
"Dancing on Doomsday"
"I Don't Believe (Love Will Ever Die)"
"Thing Called Love"
"Reddest Red"
"Will I With U"
"Thought I Knew Myself"

Charts

References

1992 albums
Gyan Evans albums
Albums produced by Charles Fisher (producer)